Special Kind of Fool is the fourth studio album by British hip hop musician Ty. It was released on BBE in 2010.

Critical reception
Martin Longley of BBC described the album as "a curious mixture of uncompromising rap and populist soulfulness, often playing side-by-side." Aaron Matthews of Exclaim! said: "This rap record needs more rapping."

Track listing

References

External links
 

2010 albums
Ty (rapper) albums
Barely Breaking Even albums